Southeast Community College (SCC) is a public community college system in the southeast portion of Nebraska.

Locations 
The college offers three campuses, six learning centers and two additional locations in Lincoln that are within the 15-county service area. The campuses are located in the following cities:

Lincoln, Nebraska (7,500 students)
Beatrice, Nebraska (700+ students)
Milford, Nebraska (800+ students)

SCC's Lincoln Campus is located at 8800 O St. on the east edge of the Capitol City. The Jack J. Huck Continuing Education Center is located at 301 S. 68th St. Place in Lincoln. Education Square, SCC's downtown Lincoln location, is at 1111 O St. StarTran buses pick up and drop off students at 8800 O St. and ESQ. Many career-technical programs are offered on the Lincoln Campus, including numerous Health Sciences programs. Academic Transfer, Business and Office Professional also are offered at 8800 O St. Academic Transfer also is offered at ESQ, along with Criminal Justice programs and Graphic Design/Media Arts.

The Beatrice Campus is located at 4771 W. Scott Road on the west side of the Gage County seat. The College's 10 intercollegiate athletic teams, as well as robust Agriculture and Nursing programs are located in Beatrice. There also is on-campus housing for several hundred students. Academic Transfer and Business programs also are offered at the campus.

The Milford Campus is located at 600 State St. in the Seward County community of Milford, which has a population of around 2,000. The Milford Campus originated in 1941 as Nebraska State Trade School. It became part of SCC in 1973. Most programs on the campus are career-technical in nature, although Academic Transfer and Business programs also are offered. On-campus dormitories are also available to students in Milford. 

SCC also offers several programs that can be completed entirely online.

Learning centers are located in Falls City, Hebron, Nebraska City, Plattsmouth, Wahoo, and York. Each offers credit and non-credit course offerings, business and industry training, and numerous services for students.

Falls City: 3200 Bill Schock Blvd.
Hebron: 610 Jefferson Ave.
Nebraska City: 1406 Central Ave.
Plattsmouth: 537 Main St.
Wahoo: 536 Broadway
York: 3130 Holen Ave.

Transfer program 

The two-year Academic Transfer program is popular among students who want to get their general education requirements completed before moving to a four-year institution. UNL is the most popular transfer location for SCC Academic Transfer students, and SCC is UNL's largest feeder school. Other popular transfer locations include Doane University and Nebraska Wesleyan.

History 
Southeast Community College has been operating in its current structure since July 1, 1973, when a statewide community college system was implemented by the Legislature.
However, the campus in Milford existed long before then. The first postsecondary technical institution, exclusively offering two-year postsecondary degrees in vocational/technical programs, was established by the Nebraska Unicameral in 1941 at Milford. Operated by the Nebraska Department of Education, the school was originally established to meet the occupational education needs of the entire state.
In 1971, the Legislature passed a bill that combined junior colleges (Fairbury, established in 1941, in SCC’s area), state vocational/technical colleges, and the area technical schools into one system of two-year institutions. The consolidation originally established eight technical community college areas. The number was reduced to six when Lincoln merged with Southeast in 1973.
The current Lincoln Campus at 8800 O St. began in 1979. Prior to that, the College operated in a number of properties throughout Lincoln.
In 1975, SCC took over the Beatrice campus of John J. Pershing College, which opened in 1966 and closed in 1971. In 1980, the agriculture program was relocated from the Milford Campus to Beatrice. In 1986, Fairbury Junior College was closed and operations moved to Beatrice. Since 1986, SCC has added a number of facilities and land to its Beatrice Campus. The Lincoln Campus also has continued to grow, as has Milford. Today, nearly 10,000 students enroll in credit classes at SCC.

Notable people
Dana Altman, college basketball coach
Patrick Bourne, former Nebraska state senator
Catherine Kidwell, novelist
Mark Kolterman, former Nebraska state senator

References

External links
Official website

Community colleges in Nebraska
Two-year colleges in the United States
Education in Lincoln, Nebraska
Education in Gage County, Nebraska
Education in Seward County, Nebraska
Buildings and structures in Gage County, Nebraska
Buildings and structures in Seward County, Nebraska
Buildings and structures in Lancaster County, Nebraska
NJCAA athletics